This is a list of seasons played by Molde Fotballklubb in Norwegian and European football, regional league seasons from 1915 to 1937 and national league seasons from 1937–38 to the most recent completed season. It details the club's achievements in major competitions, and the top scorers for some season. The statistics is up to date as of the end of the 2020 season.

1915–1936

1937–

References

Seasons
 
Molde